Kutlug Timur minaret is a minaret in Konye-Urgench in north Turkmenistan, Central Asia. It was built in 1011 during the Khwarazmian dynasty. The height of the minaret is 60 meters with a diameter of 12 metres at the base and 2 metres at the top. In 2005, the ruins of Old Urgench where the minaret is located were inscribed on the UNESCO List of World Heritage Sites. 

The Kutlug Timur minaret belongs to a group of around 60 minarets and towers built between the 11th and the 13th centuries in Central Asia, Iran and Afghanistan including the Minaret of Jam, Afghanistan. 

On the basis of its decorative brickwork, including Kufic inscriptions, the minaret is thought to be an earlier construction but restored by Kutlug-Timur around 1330.

Gallery

See also
 Minaret
 List of tallest minarets
 List of World Heritage Sites in Turkmenistan

References 

Archaeological sites in Turkmenistan
Daşoguz Region
Minarets